Georgios Marinos (born 8 May 2000) is a Greek professional footballer who plays as a winger for Super League 2 club Olympiacos B.

References

2000 births
Living people
Greek footballers
Super League Greece players
Super League Greece 2 players
Olympiacos F.C. players
Levadiakos F.C. players
Association football forwards
People from Mytilene
Olympiacos F.C. B players
Asteras Tripolis F.C. players